"You're So Hollywood" is a song by the Canadian singer Elise Estrada. It peaked at number 98 on Canadian Hot 100.

Charts

References

2010 singles
2010 songs
Songs written by Sean Hosein